Hum Intezaar Karenge is a 1989 Indian Hindi-language film directed by Prabhat Roy. It stars Mithun Chakraborty, Padmini Kolhapure, Vinod Mehra, Shakti Kapoor, Shafi Inamdar, Dina Pathak in pivotal roles. The music was composed by Bappi Lahiri.

Plot

Cast

Mithun Chakraborty as Ajay 
Padmini Kolhapure as Manisha 
Vinod Mehra as Ravi 
Shakti Kapoor as Kundan 
Shafi Inamdar as Barrister Vikas Anand
Beena Banerjee as Jyoti
Urmila Bhatt as Jyoti's Mother
Dina Pathak as Ravi's Mother 
Shiva Rindani as Shankar 
Birbal as Pinto 
Mohan Choti as Taxi Driver 
Tiku Talsania as College Professor

Soundtrack

References
 http://ibosnetwork.com/asp/filmbodetails.asp?id=Hum+Intezar+Karenge -
 http://www.bollywoodhungama.com/movies/cast/5290/index.html

External links
 

1989 films
1980s Hindi-language films
Indian action films
Films scored by Bappi Lahiri
1989 action films